Michel Maïque (13 July 1948 – 12 September 2021) was a French rugby league player and politician, and socialist Mayor of Lézignan-Corbières from 2014 to 2020.

Playing career
Former second-row FC Lézignan, he was a French international, with 8 caps between 1974 and 1979. He played for the France national team, who won against Australia in 1978 and coached France between 1982 and 1983.

He coached the France national team for one fixture, in a 17-5 defeat to Great Britain on 6 March 1983 in Hull.

After Rugby
He retired as player in 1980 at 32 years. In his civil life, he was a teacher.
He died on 12 September 2021 after suffering from acute pancreatitis and was buried at the Conilhac-Corbières cemetery.

References

External links
Michel Maique at Rugby League Project

1948 births
2021 deaths
France national rugby league team coaches
France national rugby league team players
French rugby league coaches
French rugby league players
French schoolteachers
Lézignan Sangliers players
Rugby league second-rows
Socialist Party (France) politicians
Sportspeople from Aude
Mayors of places in Occitania (administrative region)